The 2018–19 Danish Superliga season was the 29th season of the Danish Superliga. Midtjylland were the defending champions. The season started on 13 July 2018 and ended on 26 May 2019.

Teams
FC Helsingør finished as loser in the relegation play-offs in the 2017–18 season and was relegated to the 2018–19 1st Division along with Silkeborg IF, and Lyngby who lost their respective relegation play-offs as well.

The relegated teams were replaced by 2017–18 1st Division champions Vejle BK, who returned after nine years of absence, as well as the play-off winners Vendsyssel FF who got promoted to the top division for the first time ever, and  Esbjerg fB who returned after a one-year absence.

Stadia and locations

Personnel and sponsoring
Note: Flags indicate national team as has been defined under FIFA eligibility rules. Players and Managers may hold more than one non-FIFA nationality.

Managerial changes

Regular season

League table

Positions by round

Results

Championship round
Points and goals will carry over in full from the regular season.

Positions by round
Below the positions per round are shown. As teams did not all start with an equal number of points, the initial pre-playoffs positions are also given.

Relegation round
Points and goals will carry over in full from the regular season.

Group A

Group B

European play-offs
The winning team from the 4-team knock-out tournament will advance to a Europa League play-off match. In the final, the team with the most points from the relegation round group stage will host the second leg.

If the 2018–19 Danish Cup winner, found on 17 May in the final, is involved in the play-offs, they will be withdrawn, as they will enter the Europa League third qualifying round directly.

European play-off match

Relegation play-offs
The relegation play-offs were streamlined slightly compared to the previous system, essentially doing away with the former first round.

The winner of match 1 will finish 11th and stay in the Superliga, while the losers of match 2 will finish 14th and be relegated directly.

Top goalscorers

Attendances

References

External links
Superliga (uefa.com)

Danish Superliga seasons
Denmark
Superliga